Miloševo is a village in the municipality of Jagodina, Serbia. According to the 2002 census, the village has a population of 1229 people. The old name of the settlement is Domuzpotok (Домузпоток) or Domuspotok (Домуспоток).

References

Populated places in Pomoravlje District